Arnold Davydovich Margolin (born: , Kyiv – died October 29, 1956, Washington DC) – was a Ukrainian diplomat, lawyer, active participant in Ukrainian and Jewish community and political affairs; attorney who became world-famous as the defense counsel for Mendel Beilis in the notorious Jewish blood libel trial in Kyiv from 1911 to 1913. He was a justice of the Supreme Court of Appeals of Ukraine, Undersecretary of State of Ukraine and a member of the Ukrainian delegation to the Versailles Peace Conference between 1918 and 1919.

Education 
Arnold Davydovich Margolin graduated from University of Kyiv, faculty of Law (1900).

Career 
Arnold D. Margolin participated in many political trials as counsel for the defense. In 1904 - he was one of the defenders of Jewish interests in the Homel pogrom trial. From 1905–1908 in many other pogrom trials. He was one of the defenders in the trial of Mendel Beilis.

His father, David Margolin, was one of the Jewish leaders of the Jewish community in Kyiv for decades and one of the most prominent pioneers of the steamer business, and many branches of industries in Ukraine. Mr. David Margolin has been president and director of many industrial corporations in which Arnold Margolin also participated as a member of the board of directors and legal adviser. The David Margolin has built by his own means the largest Talmud Torah in Kyiv and presented it to the Jewish community of Kyiv.

Prior to the 1917 February Revolution in the Russian Empire he was Secretary General of the South Russian Branch of the Union. In 1918 he was appointed to the Supreme Court of the Ukrainian People's Republic and subsequently to the State Senate of the Ukrainian State. After the restoration of the Ukrainian People's Republic at the end of 1918 he became Assistant Minister of Foreign Affairs and a member of the Ukrainian delegation to the 1919-1920 Paris Peace Conference.

In November 1919 — he was appointed to head of the diplomatic mission in London, and on 29 January 1920 he arrived in London to take up his post. On 16 July 1920 he tendered his resignation. He prepared a case for the admission of the Ukrainian People's Republic to the League of Nations.

In 1922 — he emigrated to the United States where he practiced as a lawyer and lectured in history at several universities. Arnold Margolin was active in several Ukrainian émigré scholarly institutions and promoted Ukrainian-Jewish mutual understanding.

He served on the staff of the U.S. Office of Strategic Services during World War II.

In 1946, he wrote a long letter to The Washington Post that criticized by name president Leo Krzycki and executive secretary George Pirinsky for expressing their personal, pro-Soviet opinions as representing the American Slav Congress, which represented some seven million Slavic-Americans.  "...Most important leaders of the American Slav Congress find many things in Soviet Russia superior to the situation in America," he wrote.  He noted the "close contact" between the USA-based American Slav Congress and the USSR-based All-Slav Committee.  "By claiming that they speak in the name of the whole American Slav Congress, its leaders created an absolutely wrong impression about the real political trends and affiliations prevailing among the overwhelming majority of the American Slav population.

From 1948 — 1949 — dean of the Army's European Command Intelligence School for Army.

From 1954 — 1955 — he was the first president and professor of law at of the Ukrainian Technical Institute in New York City.

Margolin died of injuries sustained when he was struck by a car near his home in Silver Spring.

Publications 
 The Criminal Law (Articles and sketches) Kyiv, 1907
 Lombroso's Role and Significance in the Evolution of View on Crime and Punishment Kyiv, 1908
 The Liquidation Period (Sketches, Addresses, Appeals). Petrograd, 1911
 The Trial of A. D. Margolin Petrograd, 1916
 The Jews of Eastern Europe (1926), 
 From a political diary; Russia, the Ukraine, and America, 1905-1945 by A. D Margolin (1946) 
 Ukraine and Policy of the Entente (Zapiski evreia i grazhdanina) by A. D Margolin 
 Osnovy gosudarstvennogo ustroĭstva SShA by A. D Margolin 
 Ukraine and policy of the Entente by A. D Margolin (1977)
 Osnovnyia cherty novago ugolovnago ulozhenīia kriticheskīĭ ocherk s predislovīem ... R. Garro, Ėlement chuvstva v institutia nakazanīia i drugīia stat'i by A. D Margolin 
 Aperçu critique des traits fondamentaux du nouveau Code pénal russe : rapport lu à la Société juridique près l'Université de Kieff le 20 septembre 1903 by A. D Margolin
 Derzhavnyĭ ustriĭ Spoluchenykh Shtativ Ameryky by A. D Margolin 
 V polosia likvidatsīi : ocherki, riechi, kassatsīonnyia zhaloby by A. D Margolin 
 Razskazy Pis'ma iz Anglīi by A. D Margolin

References

External links
 Arnold D. Margolin Dies in Washington; Defended Mendel Beilis
 Ukrainians in the United Kingdom Online encyclopaedia
 By Arnold D. Margolin Reviewed by Robert Gale Woolbert
 Dr. Arnold D. Margolin

1877 births
1956 deaths
Politicians from Kyiv
People from Kievsky Uyezd
Ukrainian Jews
Jews from the Russian Empire
University of Kyiv, Law faculty alumni
Diplomats from Kyiv
Ambassadors of Ukraine to the United Kingdom
Ukrainian politicians
Lawyers from Kyiv
Lawyers from the Russian Empire
Taras Shevchenko National University of Kyiv alumni
People of the Office of Strategic Services
Emigrants from the Russian Empire to the United States
People who emigrated to escape Bolshevism
Jewish Ukrainian politicians